The HUB type carriage stock was a type of air conditioned passenger carriage operated by the New South Wales Government Railways from April 1948 until April 2000.

The HUB set cars were ordered by the Department of Railways New South Wales in 1943 to operate services from Sydney to Newcastle. Originally the contract was for an additional 25 N type carriages, but due to wartime restrictions construction was delayed and the contract was amended with the carriages being altered to air conditioned and an additional 3 cars added to the order. The contract was awarded to Tulloch Limited, Rhodes who built the 28 carriages numbered 2212 to 2239 between 1947 and 1949, and formed into four sets of seven carriages. The cars consisted of:
eight first class cars coded BH
four first class with buffet coded RBH
four second class coded FH
four second class with buffet coded RFH
four second class with guard coded HFH
four second class cars with power generating equipment coded PFH.

The 4 sets coded HUB were numbered 116-119, with each set originally consisting of HFH, RFH, BH, BH, RBH, FH and PFH. The first set entered service in April 1948 on the Newcastle Flyer. One briefly operated the Riverina Express before being transferred to the South Coast Daylight Express and them in 1956 to the Central West Express to Orange.

From the 1970s, the HUB sets ceased operating as fixed formations and the carriages were operated with RUB and stainless steel rolling stock on services throughout the state.

They ceased operating the Newcastle Flyer services in April 1988 and many were withdrawn as a number of locomotive hauled services ceased in the early 1990s. Some remained in service with CityRail on Southern Highlands services to Goulburn until replaced by Endeavour railcars in 1994.

Most were auctioned in August 1994 with the State Rail Authority retaining five. In 1996 three were returned to traffic for use on CountryLink's new services to Broken Hill and Griffith before being withdrawn in April 2000.

Fleet status

Gallery

References

Railway coaches of New South Wales